Kappil is a seashore tourist spot located in Thiruvananthapuram district, Kerala, India. It is located in Edava Panchayat of Varkala Taluk. Varkala railway station is the major railway station near Kappil.

Transportation

Road
Kappil lies on the Varkala - Paravur - Kollam Road.

Rail

Kappil railway station

Edava railway station

Air
Trivandrum International Airport, located 46 km away.

Tourism

Scenic backwaters, beach and facilities for watersport are available. 

Kappil is also famous for the Kappil Bhagavathy Temple and is a tourist spot during the festival season.

Nearby Places
 Varkala Beach
 Odayam Beach
 Manthra Beach
 Sivagiri Mutt
 Varkala Black Beach
 Janardhanaswami Temple
 Kappil Devi Temple

Gallery

References

External links
 

Villages in Kollam district
Beaches of Kerala